Deadly Nightshade may refer to:
 Deadly nightshade (Atropa belladonna), a poisonous perennial herbaceous plant in the nightshade family
 Deadly Nightshade (comics), a Marvel Comics character 
 Deadly Nightshade (film), a 1953 British crime drama film
 The Deadly Nightshade, an American rock and country band
 "Deadly Nightshade", a song by the Sword from the album Used Future

See also
 Nightshade (disambiguation)